Poniente is a 2002 Spanish film directed by Chus Gutiérrez and co-written by Icíar Bollaín which stars Cuca Escribano and José Coronado alongside Mariola Fuentes, Antonio Dechent and Farid Fatmi.

Plot 
The backdrop in which the fiction takes place is based on the 2000 El Ejido race riots. Upon Lucía's return to her hometown of "La Isla" in the province of Almería and taking possession of a greenhouse inherited from her deceased father, she is witness to a concerning situation at the intensive farming complex in the province, featuring abuse inflicted on the North-African undocumented immigrant labourers, who live under deplorable conditions. This situation pits her against her cousin Miguel while bonds her closer to Curro (a migrant returned from Switzerland who presses for better conditions for the workers) and Perla, a prostitute.

Cast

Production 
The screenplay was penned by Chus Gutiérrez in collaboration with Icíar Bollaín. The film was produced by Olmo Films and Amboto Audiovisual, with the participation of Antena 3 and Vía Digital. Shooting locations included Torrenueva (province of Granada) and Cabo de Gata (province of Almería).

Release 
Picked up for the 'Upstream' section lineup of the 59th Venice International Film Festival, the film was presented on 1 September 2002 at the aforementioned festival. It also screened at the 27th Toronto International Film Festival later in September. Distributed by Araba Films, the film was theatrically released in Spain on 13 September 2002.

Reception 
Jonathan Holland of Variety assessed Poniente to be Gutiérrez' "strongest film to date", a "socially committed, dexterously plotted drama" and "an all-too-rare Spanish take on the issue of racism in Europe".

Mirito Torreiro of Fotogramas scored 3 out of 5 stars, writing that the film takes a firm stance in favour of the dispossessed, while resenting the film's excessive "schematism".

See also 
 List of Spanish films of 2002

References

Bibliography 
 
 
 

2002 drama films
Spanish romantic drama films
Films shot in the province of Almería
Films shot in the province of Granada
Films about immigration to Spain
Films about racism in Spain
2000s Spanish-language films
Films set in Andalusia
2000s Spanish films